Mike Twellman (born December 18, 1960 in St. Louis, Missouri) was a U.S. soccer defender who played two seasons in the North American Soccer League, one in the United Soccer League and two in the first Major Indoor Soccer League.

High school and college
Twellman, and his brothers Tim, and Steve, grew up in the soccer hot bed of St. Louis, Missouri.  Twellman, along with his brothers, attended and played soccer at St. Louis University High School.  He attended Southern Illinois University Edwardsville where he played on the men’s soccer team from 1979 to 1982.  In 1979, he was a member of the SIUE NCAA Men's Soccer Championship team.  Twellman was inducted into the SIUE Athletic Hall of Fame in 2006 as part of the 1979 national championship soccer team.

Professional
In 1982, Twellman was drafted by both the Chicago Sting of the North American Soccer League and the St. Louis Steamers of Major Indoor Soccer League (MISL).  He chose to sign with the Sting and played two seasons in Chicago.  In 1984, the Sting released Twellman and he moved to the Jacksonville Tea Men of the United Soccer League.  On October 2, 1984, Twellman signed as a free agent with the Dallas Sidekicks of the Major Indoor Soccer League (MISL).  He played the 1984-1985 season and was released by the team on April 16, 1985.

References

External links
 Dallas Sidekicks profile
 NASL/MISL stats

1960 births
Living people
American soccer players
Chicago Sting (NASL) players
Chicago Sting (MISL) players
Dallas Sidekicks (original MISL) players
Jacksonville Tea Men players
Major Indoor Soccer League (1978–1992) players
North American Soccer League (1968–1984) indoor players
North American Soccer League (1968–1984) players
Soccer players from St. Louis
SIU Edwardsville Cougars men's soccer players
United Soccer League (1984–85) players
Association football defenders